Luciano discography may refer to:
The discography of Luciano (DJ)
The discography of Luciano (singer)
The discography of Luciano (rapper)